Arakkonam Taluk is a taluk in Ranipettai district of the Indian state of Tamil Nadu. The headquarters of the taluk is the town of Arakkonam.
Some parts of the taluk including Arakkonam town comes under the jurisdiction of the Greater Chennai Metropolitan Area.

Demographics
According to the 2011 census, the taluk of Arakkonam had a population of 508921 with 254504  males and 254417 females. There were 1000 women for every 1000 men. The taluk had a literacy rate of 69.75. Child population in the age group below 6 was 27479 Males and 26073 Females.

References 

 India Study Channel

Taluks of Vellore district